Clifton Truman Daniel (born June 5, 1957) is an American writer and public relations executive who is the oldest grandson of former United States President Harry S. Truman and First Lady Bess Truman. He is a son of the late E. Clifton Daniel Jr., former managing editor of The New York Times, and best-selling mystery writer Margaret Truman.

He is the Director of Public Relations for Truman College, one of the seven City Colleges of Chicago. Prior to that, he worked as a feature writer and editor for the Morning Star and Sunday Star-News a New York Times paper in Wilmington, North Carolina.

Daniel is the honorary chairman of the board of trustees of the Harry S. Truman Library Institute, the member-supported, nonprofit partner of the Harry S. Truman Library and Museum in Independence, Missouri. He is a frequent speaker and fundraiser.

Daniel visited Hiroshima and Nagasaki in 2012, the sites where his grandfather had ordered the only use of atomic bombs for warfare in history.

He appeared in 2016 on Race for the White House as a commentator for his grandfather's experiences during both his first term and the 1948 United States presidential election.

Works
He is the author of two books:

References

External links
ctrumandaniel.com Website of Clifton Daniel
Beneath the Mushroom Cloud An audio account by Clifton Daniel

1957 births
Living people
Truman family
Place of birth missing (living people)